Alexander Ross may refer to:

 Alexander Ross (writer) (c. 1590–1654), vicar; Scottish author of Medicus Medicatus
 Alexander Ross (poet) (1699–1784), Scottish author of Helenore, or the Fortunate Shepherdess
 Alexander Ross (British Army officer) (1742–1827), Surveyor-General of the Ordnance
 Alexander Ross (fur trader) (1783–1856), Canadian fur trader
 Alexander Ross (civil servant) (1800–1889), British civil servant in India
 Alexander McKenzie Ross (1805–1862), British engineer
 Alexander Coffman Ross, author of the 1840 campaign song "Tippecanoe and Tyler Too"
 Alexander Ross (Canadian politician) (1829–1901), Canadian banker and politician
 Alexander Henry Ross (1829–1888), British barrister and Conservative politician
 Alexander Milton Ross (1832–1897), Canadian abolitionist
 Alexander Peter Ross (1833–1915), Canadian politician
 Alexander Ross (architect) (1834–1925), Scottish architect and provost of Inverness
 Alexander Ross (Australian politician) (1843–1912), New South Wales politician
 Alexander Ross (engineer) (1845–1923), Scottish railway engineer
 Alexander Charles Ross (1847–1921), business executive and political figure in Nova Scotia, Canada
 Alexander Clark Ross, mayor of Sherbrooke, 1942–1944
 Alex Ross (rower) (Sir Alexander Ross, 1907–1994), New Zealand-born banker and rower
 Alexander David Ross (1883–1966), Scots-born physicist and astronomer
 Alexander Ross (cricketer) (1895–1972), Scottish cricketer and civil servant
 Alexander Ross (missionary) (1838-1884)
 Alexander Ross (investment manager) (1970-present)

See also
 Alec Ross (disambiguation)
 Alex Ross (disambiguation)
 Ross (name)